In Greek mythology, Evanthes or Euanthes (Ancient Greek: Εὐανθής means "the richly blooming") may refer to two different individuals:

 Evanthes, son of Oenopion, son of Ariadne and Dionysus. His mother was probably the nymph Helice and his only sister was Merope (Aero) who was raped by the giant Orion. Together with his brothers, Talus, Melas, Salagus and Athamas, they followed their father when he sailed from Crete to settle in Chios. Other sources makes Euanthes a son of Dionysus and Ariadne and brother to Oenopion, Thoas, Staphylus, Latromis and Tauropolis. He was also said to be one the generals of Rhadamanthys who was presented by the later with the city of Maroneia. Euanthes had a son Maron who was encountered by Odysseus in Ismarus, land of the Ciconians.
 Evanthes, a Phrygian who fought on Aeneas' side in Italy. He was killed by Mezentius, king of the Etruscans.

Notes

References 

 Diodorus Siculus, The Library of History translated by Charles Henry Oldfather. Twelve volumes. Loeb Classical Library. Cambridge, Massachusetts: Harvard University Press; London: William Heinemann, Ltd. 1989. Vol. 3. Books 4.59–8. Online version at Bill Thayer's Web Site
 Diodorus Siculus, Bibliotheca Historica. Vol 1-2. Immanel Bekker. Ludwig Dindorf. Friedrich Vogel. in aedibus B. G. Teubneri. Leipzig. 1888-1890. Greek text available at the Perseus Digital Library.
 Hesiod, Catalogue of Women from Homeric Hymns, Epic Cycle, Homerica translated by Evelyn-White, H G. Loeb Classical Library Volume 57. London: William Heinemann, 1914. Online version at theio.com
 Homer, The Odyssey with an English Translation by A.T. Murray, PH.D. in two volumes. Cambridge, MA., Harvard University Press; London, William Heinemann, Ltd. 1919. . Online version at the Perseus Digital Library. Greek text available from the same website.
 Lucius Flavius Philostratus, Heroica, translation by Jennifer K. Berenson Maclean and Ellen Bradshaw Aitken, Flavius Philostratus: On Heroes, WGRW 3 (Atlanta: Society of Biblical Literature, 2002), XX. Harvard University's Center for Hellenic Studies. Online version at the Topos Text Project.
Lucius Flavius Philostratus, Flavii Philostrati Opera. Vol 2. Carl Ludwig Kayser. in aedibus B. G. Teubneri. Lipsiae. 1871. Greek text available at the Perseus Digital Library.
Pausanias, Description of Greece with an English Translation by W.H.S. Jones, Litt.D., and H.A. Ormerod, M.A., in 4 Volumes. Cambridge, MA, Harvard University Press; London, William Heinemann Ltd. 1918. . Online version at the Perseus Digital Library
Pausanias, Graeciae Descriptio. 3 vols. Leipzig, Teubner. 1903.  Greek text available at the Perseus Digital Library.
Publius Vergilius Maro, Aeneid. Theodore C. Williams. trans. Boston. Houghton Mifflin Co. 1910. Online version at the Perseus Digital Library.
 Publius Vergilius Maro, Bucolics, Aeneid, and Georgics. J. B. Greenough. Boston. Ginn & Co. 1900. Latin text available at the Perseus Digital Library.

Children of Dionysus
Demigods in classical mythology
Aeneid